Vriesea heterostachys is a species of flowering plant in the Bromeliaceae family. The bromeliad is endemic to the Atlantic Forest biome (Mata Atlantica Brasileira), located in southeastern Brazil.

Cultivars
Garden cultivars include:
 Vriesea 'Burgundy Bubbles'
 Vriesea 'Highlights'
 Vriesea 'Little Dumplin''
 Vriesea 'One Year'
 Vriesea 'Sweetheart'

References

BSI Cultivar Registry Retrieved 11 October 2009

heterostachys
Endemic flora of Brazil
Flora of the Atlantic Forest
Taxa named by John Gilbert Baker
Taxa named by Lyman Bradford Smith